Körösladány is a town in Békés County, in the Southern Great Plain region of south-east Hungary.

Béla Wenckheim, a Hungarian politician, who served as the Prime Minister of Hungary in 1875, was born here.

Jews lived in the city in the 19th and 20th centuries until the German Nazis destroyed the Jewish community in the Holocaust.

Geography
It covers an area of 123.87 km² and has a population of 4557 people (2015).

Politics
The current mayor of Körösladány is Károly Kardos (Fidesz-KDNP).

The local Municipal Assembly has 6+1 members divided into this political parties and alliances:

References

External links

  in Hungarian

Populated places in Békés County
Jewish communities destroyed in the Holocaust